"Better" is a song by American singer Khalid Robinson from his first EP Suncity (2018). It was released as the lead single from the EP on September 14, 2018. It was also included on the album Free Spirit. The song was a commercial success and became Khalid's first solo top 10 single in the US.

Commercial performance
"Better" peaked at number eight in the US in its 30th week, making it one of the slowest ascends to the top 10 on the Billboard Hot 100. Internationally, the song peaked at number 14 in Canada, number four in Malaysia, New Zealand, and Singapore, six in Australia, and various spots in the top 10 and top 40.

Additionally, "Better" marked Khalid's second number one on the Billboard Hot R&B Songs chart, following the 11-week run of "Young Dumb & Broke". It also became his first number-one on Billboard's Rhythmic chart in its February 16, 2019 issue.

Charts

Weekly charts

Year-end charts

Certifications

Release history

References

2018 singles
Khalid (singer) songs
Song recordings produced by Stargate (record producers)
Songs written by Khalid (singer)
Songs written by Mikkel Storleer Eriksen
Songs written by Tor Erik Hermansen
2018 songs